Maxime Lucu (born 12 January 1993) is a French rugby union player. His position is scrum-half and he currently plays for Bordeaux Bègles in the Top 14.

In February 2021 he was called into the France Senior Test team for the 2021 Six Nations.

Honours

International 
 France
Six Nations Championship: 2022
Grand Slam: 2022

References

External links
France profile at FFR
UBB profile
L'Équipe profile

1993 births
Living people
French rugby union players
Biarritz Olympique players
Union Bordeaux Bègles players
Rugby union scrum-halves
French-Basque people
People from Saint-Jean-de-Luz
Sportspeople from Pyrénées-Atlantiques